Marcus Eugene Jones (April 25, 1852 – June 3, 1934) was an American geologist, mining engineer and botanist. Throughout his career he was known for being an educator, scientist and minister. As an early explorer of the western United States, he is known as the authority for numerous vascular plants. Much of his career was spent self-employed in Salt Lake City, Utah. In his later years, and after the death of his wife, he lived in Claremont, California.

Childhood 

Marcus Eugene Jones was born in Jefferson, Ohio.

Major revisions 
One of Jones' most notable accomplishments was his self-published revision of the North American species of Astragalus.

References

External links 
 The Marcus E Jones archive held at the Rancho Santa Ana Botanic Garden

American geologists
1852 births
1934 deaths
Botanists active in North America
People from Claremont, California
People from Salt Lake City
Scientists from California
19th-century American botanists
20th-century American botanists
People from Jefferson, Ohio